Donald King (born August 20, 1931) is an American boxing promoter, known for his involvement in several historic boxing matchups. He has been a controversial figure, partly due to a manslaughter conviction and civil cases against him, as well as allegations of dishonest business practices by numerous boxers.

King's career highlights include, among multiple other enterprises, promoting "The Rumble in the Jungle" and the "Thrilla in Manila". King has promoted some of the most prominent names in boxing, including Muhammad Ali, Joe Frazier, George Foreman, Larry Holmes, Tomasz Adamek, Roberto Duran, Mike Tyson, Evander Holyfield, Chris Byrd, John Ruiz, Julio César Chávez, Ricardo Mayorga, Andrew Golota, Bernard Hopkins, Félix Trinidad, Roy Jones Jr., Azumah Nelson, Gerald McClellan, Marco Antonio Barrera, and Christy Martin. Some of these boxers sued him for allegedly defrauding them. Most of the lawsuits were settled out of court. Mike Tyson was quoted as saying, “He did more bad to black fighters than any white promoter ever in the history of boxing.”

King has been charged with killing two people in incidents 13 years apart. In 1954, King shot a man in the back after spotting him trying to rob one of his gambling houses; this incident was ruled a justifiable homicide. In 1967, King was convicted of voluntary manslaughter for stomping one of his employees to death. For this, he served three years and eleven months in prison.

Early life 
King was born in Cleveland, Ohio, where he attended school and graduated from John Adams High in 1951. After dropping out of Kent State University, he ran an illegal bookmaking operation out of the basement of a record store on Kinsman Road, and was charged with killing two men in incidents 13 years apart. The first was determined to be justifiable homicide after it was found that King shot Hillary Brown in the back and killed him while he was attempting to rob one of King's gambling houses in 1954. In 1967, King was convicted of second-degree murder for the second killing after he was found guilty of stomping to death an employee, Sam Garrett, who owed him $600. While he served his term at the Marion Correctional Institution, he began self-education; according to his own words, he read everything in the prison library he could get his hands on.

Having been released in 1972, King was pardoned in 1983 by Ohio Governor Jim Rhodes, with letters from Jesse Jackson, Coretta Scott King, George Voinovich, Art Modell, and Gabe Paul, among others, being written in support of King.

Career 
King entered the boxing world after convincing Muhammad Ali to box in a charity exhibition for a local hospital in Cleveland with the help of singer Lloyd Price. Early on he formed a partnership with a local promoter named Don Elbaum, who already had a stable of fighters in Cleveland and years of experience in boxing. In 1974, King negotiated to promote a heavyweight championship fight between Muhammad Ali and George Foreman in Zaire, popularly known as "The Rumble in the Jungle". The fight between Ali and Foreman was a much-anticipated event. King's rivals all sought to promote the bout, but King was able to secure the then-record $10 million purse through an arrangement with the government of Zaire.

King arranged Ali's 1975 fight against journeyman Chuck Wepner. It is widely believed the fight inspired Sylvester Stallone to write the screenplay for Rocky (1976).

King solidified his position as one of boxing's preeminent promoters the following year with the third fight between Ali and Joe Frazier in Manila, the capital of the Philippines, which King deemed the "Thrilla in Manila". Aside from promoting the premier heavyweight fights of the 1970s, King was also busy expanding his boxing empire. Throughout the decade, he compiled an impressive roster of fighters, many of whom would finish their career with Hall of Fame credentials. Fighters including Larry Holmes, Wilfred Benítez, Roberto Durán, Salvador Sánchez, Wilfredo Gómez, and Alexis Argüello would all fight under the Don King Productions promotional banner in the 1970s.

For the next two decades, King continued to be among boxing's most successful promoters. Mike Tyson, Evander Holyfield, Julio César Chávez, Aaron Pryor, Bernard Hopkins, Ricardo López, Félix Trinidad, Terry Norris, Carlos Zárate, Azumah Nelson, Andrew Gołota, Mike McCallum, Gerald McClellan, Meldrick Taylor, Marco Antonio Barrera, Tomasz Adamek, John Ruiz, and Ricardo Mayorga are some of the boxers who chose King to promote many of their biggest fights.

Outside of boxing, he was the concert promoter for The Jacksons' 1984 Victory Tour. In 1998, King purchased a Cleveland-based weekly newspaper serving the African-American community in Ohio, the Call and Post, and as of 2011 continued as its publisher.

King, was elected to the Gaming Hall of Fame in 2008.

Personal life 

Don King's wife, Henrietta, died on December 2, 2010, at the age of 87. He has one biological daughter, Debbie, a son, Eric and adopted son Carl, five grandchildren and three great grandchildren.

King is politically active and supported Barack Obama in the 2008 and 2012 presidential elections. During the previous election, he had made media appearances promoting George W. Bush, which had included attendance at the 2004 Republican National Convention in New York City.

On June 10, 1987, King was made a 'Mason-at-Sight' by 'Grand Master' Odes J. Kyle Jr. of the Most Worshipful Prince Hall 'Grand Lodge' of Ohio, thereby making him a Prince Hall Freemason. In the following year, he was awarded an honorary Doctorate of Humane letters degree from Central State University in Wilberforce, Ohio, by University President Dr. Arthur E. Thomas.

King has conducted an annual turkey giveaway each Christmas for several years, in which he distributes two thousand free turkeys to needy South Floridians.

Controversies 
King has been investigated for possible connections with organized crime. During a 1992 Senate investigation, King invoked the Fifth Amendment when questioned about his connection to mobster John Gotti.

When IBF president Robert W. "Bobby" Lee, Sr. was indicted for racketeering in 1999, King was not indicted, nor did he testify at Lee's trial, though prosecutors reportedly "called him an unindicted co-conspirator who was the principal beneficiary of Lee's machinations."

Lawsuits and prosecutions

Muhammad Ali 
King has been involved in many litigation cases with boxers that were focused on fraud. In 1982, he was sued by Muhammad Ali for underpaying him $1.1 million for a fight with Larry Holmes. King called in an old friend of Ali, Jeremiah Shabazz, and handed him a suitcase containing $50,000 in cash and a letter ending Ali's lawsuit against King. He asked Shabazz to visit Ali (who was in the hospital due to his failing health) and get him to sign the letter and then give Ali the $50,000. Ali signed. The letter even gave King the right to promote any future Ali fights. According to Shabazz, "Ali was ailing by then and mumbling a lot. I guess he needed the money." Shabazz later regretted helping King. Ali's lawyer cried when he learned that Ali had ended the lawsuit without telling him.

Larry Holmes 
Larry Holmes has alleged that over the course of his career King cheated him out of $10 million in fight purses, including claiming 25% of his purses as a hidden manager. Holmes says he received only $150,000 of a contracted $500,000 for his fight with Ken Norton, and $50,000 of $200,000 for facing Earnie Shavers, and claims King cut his purses for bouts with Muhammad Ali, Randall "Tex" Cobb, and Leon Spinks, underpaying him $2 million, $700,000, and $250,000, respectively. Holmes sued King over the accounting and auditing for the Gerry Cooney fight, charging that he was underpaid by $2 to $3 million. Holmes sued King after King deducted a $300,000 'finder's fee' from his fight purse against Mike Tyson; Holmes settled for $150,000 and also signed a legal agreement pledging not to give any more negative information about King to reporters.

Tim Witherspoon 
Tim Witherspoon was threatened with being blackballed if he did not sign exclusive contracts with King and his stepson Carl. Not permitted to have his own lawyer present, he signed four "contracts of servitude" (according to Jack Newfield). One was an exclusive promotional contract with Don King, two were managerial contracts with Carl King, identical except one was "for show" that gave Carl King 33% of Witherspoon's purses and the other gave King a 50% share, more than is allowed by many boxing commissions. The fourth contract was completely blank.

Other examples include Witherspoon being promised $150,000 for his fight with Larry Holmes, but receiving only $52,750. King's son Carl took 50% of Witherspoon's purse, illegal under Nevada rules, and the WBC sanctioning fee was also deducted from his purse. He was forced to train at King's own training camp at Orwell, Ohio, instead of Ali's Deer Lake camp which Ali allowed Witherspoon to use for free. For his fight with Greg Page he received a net amount of $44,460 from his guaranteed purse of $250,000. King had deducted money for training expenses, sparring partners, fight and airplane tickets for his friends and family. Witherspoon was never paid a stipulated $100,000 for his training expenses and instead was billed $150 a day for using King's training camp. Carl King again received 50% of his purse, despite Don King Productions falsely claiming he had only been paid 33%.  HBO paid King $1,700,000 for Witherspoon to fight Frank Bruno. Witherspoon got a purse of $500,000, but received only $90,000 after King's deductions. Carl King received $275,000. In 1987, Witherspoon sued King for $25 million in damages. He eventually settled for $1 million out of court.

Mike Tyson 
Former undisputed World Heavyweight Boxing Champion Mike Tyson has described King, his former promoter, as "ruthless", "deplorable", and "greedy". In 1998, Tyson sued King for $100 million, alleging that the boxing promoter had cheated him out of millions over more than a decade. The lawsuit was later settled out of court, with Tyson receiving $14 million.

Terry Norris 
In 1996, Terry Norris sued King, alleging that King had stolen money from him and conspired with his manager to underpay him for fights. The case went to trial, but King settled out of court for $7.5 million in 2003. King also acceded to Norris's demand that the settlement be made public.

ESPN 

In 2005, King launched a $2.5 billion defamation suit against the Walt Disney Pictures–owned ESPN, the makers of SportsCentury, after a documentary alleged that King had "killed, not once, but twice", threatened to break Larry Holmes' legs, had a hospital invest into a film that was never made, cheated Meldrick Taylor out of $1 million, and then threatened to have Taylor killed. Though the documentary repeated many claims that were already made, King said he had now had enough. King's attorney said "It was slanted to show Don in the worst way. It was one-sided from day one, Don is a strong man, but he has been hurt by this."

The case was dismissed on summary judgment with a finding that King could not show "actual malice" from the defendants, and that King had failed to prove that any of the challenged statements were false. The judgment also pointed out that the studio had tried on a number of occasions to interview King for the documentary, but he had declined; while not suggesting that King had a legal obligation to do so, the court sympathized with ESPN's circumstances on those grounds. King appealed the decision and, 3 years later, the Second District Court of Appeals upheld the summary judgment, but disagreed with the original finding that none of the statements were false. In any case, Judge Dorian Damoorgian ruled, "Nothing in the record shows that ESPN purposefully made false statements about King in order to bolster the theme of the program or to inflict harm on King".

Lennox Lewis 
In May 2003, King was sued by Lennox Lewis, who wanted $385 million from the promoter, claiming King used threats to pull Tyson away from a rematch with Lewis.

Chris Byrd 
In early 2006, Chris Byrd sued Don King for breach of contract, and the two eventually settled out of court under the condition that Byrd would be released from his contract with King.

Donald Trump event controversy 
On September 21, 2016, King caused controversy when introducing Donald Trump at a campaign event at a black church in Cleveland by using the word "nigga" seemingly by accident. In King's speech, he was giving his thoughts on how black people cannot achieve success in the United States by acting like white people, stating: "If you're poor, you are a poor negro -- I would use the n-word -- but if you're rich, you are a rich negro. If you are intelligent, intellectual, you are intellectual negro. If you are a dancing and sliding and gliding nigga -- I mean negro -- you are a dancing and sliding and gliding negro."

Media appearances
King appeared in the 2-part Miami Vice episode "Down for the Count". (Season 3, Episodes 12/13)

King acted in a small role as more or less himself in The Last Fight (1982) and in the comedy Head Office (1985). He also had another brief cameo as himself in the film The Devil's Advocate (1997). He also appeared in a season 4 episode of Knight Rider, titled "Redemption of a Champion".

King made an appearance in the documentaries Beyond the Ropes (2008) and Klitschko (2011).

King appeared in Moonlighting episode "Symphony in Knocked Flat" (Season 3, Episode 3) as himself.

Media portrayals

As a character
 In 1995, HBO aired Tyson, a television movie based upon the life of Mike Tyson, in which King was portrayed by actor Paul Winfield.
 In 1997, Ving Rhames played King in a television movie, Don King: Only in America which aired on HBO. Rhames won a Golden Globe Award for his portrayal of King.
 In 1998, for the tenth episode of South Park'''s first season, "Damien", Jesus and Satan are pitted against one another in a boxing match to decide the conflict between good and evil; a character spoofing Don King appears,  promoting Satan and the fight.
 In its first season, In Living Color featured a one-time sketch titled "King: The Early Years", set in a schoolyard in 1939, in which the narrator first leads viewers to believe that Martin Luther King Jr. got his start in childhood as a peacemaker between two fighting classmatesuntil "King" is revealed as a young Don King (portrayed by Damon Wayans), who promoted the schoolyard scuffle.
 In the episode "My Brother's Keeper" of The Fresh Prince of Bel-Air, Carlton is portrayed as Don King in one of Will's dreams.
 In Celebrity Deathmatch, King's death was a running gag during the series' first season. In the final episode of the second season, he was matched against Donald Trump, with King being killed again, this time in the ring.
 He was portrayed by Dave Chappelle in a skit about a "Gay America", as promoting a boxing match between two gay boxers.
 King helped create the video game Don King Presents: Prizefighter for the Xbox 360, which he promoted on IGN's podcast, Three Red Lights, and another called Don King Boxing for Wii. There is also a Nintendo DS version of Don King Boxing.
 King was featured in the 2001 film Ali, promoting the Rumble in the Jungle title fight between Muhammad Ali and George Foreman. He was portrayed by Mykelti Williamson in the film.

Characters based on King
The character of George Washington Duke, the flamboyant boxing promoter in the film Rocky V (1990), is modeled at least in part on Don King, even using King's famous catchphrase "Only in America!"
"The Homer They Fall", a 1996 episode in season 8 of the animated series The Simpsons, features a boxing promoter, Lucius Sweet (voiced by Paul Winfield), whose appearance is modeled on King, especially his hairstyle. In fact, Homer Simpson comments that Sweet is "exactly as rich and as famous as Don King, and he looks just like him, too!”
In the 2005 Xbox video game Jade Empire, a character named Qui The Promoter is based on Don King, including personality and his speech patterns.
In the 2016 indie video game Punch Club'', A character named Din Kong is modeled after King. In this game, Kong serves as the player's fight promoter in one of the conclusions of the game.

Awards and honors 
1997: International Boxing Hall of Fame inductee
2008: Gaming Hall of Fame inductee
2015: Street in Newark, New Jersey renamed Don King Way
2016: Shaker Boulevard in Cleveland renamed Don King Way

References

External links 
 Don King Promotions
 

1931 births
African-American sports executives and administrators
American sports executives and administrators
American boxing promoters
American Freemasons
American Prince Hall Freemasons
American people convicted of manslaughter
Justifiable homicide
Living people
Ohio Republicans
People from Cleveland
Recipients of American gubernatorial pardons
John Adams High School (Ohio) alumni
21st-century African-American people
20th-century African-American sportspeople
Boxing promoters